"The Days of Perky Pat" is a science fiction short story by American writer Philip K. Dick, first published in 1963 in Amazing magazine.

Plot 
In this novel, survivors of a global thermonuclear war live in isolated enclaves in California, surviving off what they can scrounge from the wastes and supplies delivered from Mars. The older generation spend their leisure time playing with the eponymous doll in an escapist role-playing game that recalls life before the apocalypse — a way of life that is being quickly forgotten. At the story's climax, a couple from one isolated outpost of humanity plays a game against the dwellers of another outpost (who play the game with a doll similar to Perky Pat dubbed "Connie Companion") in deadly earnest. The survivors' shared enthusiasm for the Perky Pat doll and the creation of her accessories from vital supplies is a sort of mass delusion that prevents meaningful re-building of the shattered society. In stark contrast, the children of the survivors show absolutely no interest in the delusion and have begun adapting to their new life.

References in popular culture 
David Cronenberg's 1999 film eXistenZ, which involves a virtual reality game that blurs reality and fantasy, visually refers to the Dick short story when its two stars, Jude Law and Jennifer Jason Leigh, consume fast food from containers marked "Perky Pat's".

In the movie Screamers, Peter Weller's character refers to someone sarcastically as a real "Perky Pat".

References in other works 
Elements of the story were later incorporated into Dick's novel The Three Stigmata of Palmer Eldritch, written in 1964 and published in 1965, in which a Perky Pat simulation game is induced by drugs and miniature models.

References

External links
 

Short stories by Philip K. Dick
1963 short stories
Works originally published in Amazing Stories